This is a list of Bangladeshi films released in 1987.

Releases

References

Film
Bangladesh
 1987